Julie Tian, or Tian Ling-ling or Julie Chien (born October 27, 1937), is a politician from Taiwan. Tian graduated from the National Chengchi University with a bachelor's degree in Spanish in 1960 and later on earned a master of library science from the George Peabody College for Teachers. Tian is the wife of Fredrick Chien, the former Foreign Minister and former President of the Control Yuan of the Republic of China. 

During her husband's tenure as the ROC Representative to the United States, Tian presided over the restoration and redecoration efforts of the Twin Oaks Estate.

Tian is a standing committee member of the National Women's League of the R.O.C.

Works
.

References

Spouses of Taiwanese politicians
Taiwanese women in politics
1937 births
Living people
National Chengchi University alumni
Peabody College alumni